Mike Harris is an American politician in the Republican Party serving as a member of the Michigan House of Representatives. His district, the 43rd, represents areas covering Lake Angelus, Clarkston, Independence Township, and part of Waterford Township. He was elected in a special election in May 2022.

Harris is a supporter of same-sex marriage. However, on March 8th, 2023, Harris voted against House Bill 4003, which would end discrimination based on gender identity and sexual orientation in the state of Michigan; the bill passed anyway.

An opponent of firearm restrictions and red flag laws, he owns and operates Paladin Training and Consulting, a firearms-training company.

Harris co-sponsored a bill to replace a statue of Lewis Cass with a statue of Coleman Young because Cass, as explained in the text of the bill, “played a prominent role in the implementation of President Andrew Jackson's Indian removal policy, was a proponent of allowing states and territories to permit slavery, and enslaved at least one person himself.”

References 

Year of birth missing (living people)
Living people
Republican Party members of the Michigan House of Representatives
21st-century American politicians